Ga'dang is an Austronesian dialect spoken in Northern Luzon, Philippines particularly in Paracelis, Mountain Province, Luzon; Potia, Ifugao Province; and Tabuk, Kalinga Province.

References

Languages of Mountain Province
Languages of Ifugao
Cagayan Valley languages